Robert Brubaker (October 9, 1916 – April 15, 2010) was an American character actor best known for his roles in television and movie westerns, including Gunsmoke and 40 Guns to Apache Pass.

Early years 
Brubaker was born in Robinson, Illinois, on October 9, 1916, the son of George Brubaker.  His interest in acting developed when he was a student at Robinson Township High School. He dropped out of Northwestern University after two years and went to New York.

Military service 
During World War II, Brubaker was an aircraft commander in the U.S. Army Air Force. Later, he served during the Berlin Airlift, and in the Korean War he was a part of the Strategic Air Command.

Career 
Brubaker debuted as a professional actor in Oh Say Can You Sing, Dance or Act (1936), a production of the Federal Theatre Project. While he worked at radio station KMPC, Brubaker caught the attention of an executive of Paramount Pictures, and his film debut came in a bit part in Blonde Alibi (1946).

Brubaker portrayed a deputy in the syndicated television series U.S. Marshal. He was the only actor to have two recurring roles on the television series, Gunsmoke, portraying both a bartender named Floyd and a stagecoach driver named Jim Buck (often uncredited). Some of Brubaker's other credits included the Rock Hudson film, Seconds, and television crime dramas The Walter Winchell File and Perry Mason, and the television police drama The Asphalt Jungle.

Later years
After he left acting, Brubaker worked for Forest Lawn Cemetery as a director in the training department. When he retired from that job, he moved to Lake Elsinore, California.

Death 
Brubaker died on April 15, 2010, at the age of 93. He was buried at Forest Lawn Memorial Park, Glendale, in Southern California.

Partial filmography

 Blonde Alibi (1946) – Pedestrian (uncredited)
 The Court-Martial of Billy Mitchell (1955) – Major H.H. Arnold
 Pardners (1956) – Businessman (uncredited)
 The Girl He Left Behind (1956) – Colonel Thomas Murphy (uncredited)
 Written on the Wind (1956) – Hotel Manager (uncredited)
 The Book of Acts Series (1957) – Simon Peter
 The Walter Winchell File – "Act of Folly" –  (1957) –  Beckman
 Battle Hymn (1957) – Briefing Officer (uncredited)
 Mister Cory (1957) – Card Player (uncredited)
 Man of a Thousand Faces (1957) – Jack Conway, Director of 'Unholy Three' (uncredited)
 My Man Godfrey (1957) – Man with Monkey
 The Female Animal (1958) – Bartender (uncredited)
 The Gift of Love (1958) – State Trooper (uncredited)
 Official Detective – "Tinseled Alibi" –  (1958) – Snyder
 The Walter Winchell File – "Portrait of A Cop" (1958) – Janis
 The Heart Is a Rebel (1958) – Dr. Chambers
 The Walking Target (1960) – Brenner (uncredited)
 Moon Pilot (1962) – Space Flight Technician (uncredited)
 Seven Days in May (1964) – Gen. Diefenbach (uncredited)
 Apache Rifles (1964) – Sgt. Cobb
 Mirage (1965) – Bar Patron (uncredited)
 40 Guns to Apache Pass (1966) – Sergeant Walker
 Seconds (1966) – Mayberry
 Airport (1970) – Dr. Nash (uncredited)
 The Brotherhood of the Bell (1970) – Bell Operative (uncredited)
 The Bus Is Coming (1971) – Chief Jackson
 The Sting (1973) – Bill Clayton from Pittsburgh (uncredited)

(TV)”Dragnet. 1970. Father of drug addict.

References

External links
 

Boot Hill: R.I.P. Robert Brubaker 

1916 births
2010 deaths
American male film actors
American male television actors
Male Western (genre) film actors
People from Robinson, Illinois
Male actors from Illinois
20th-century American male actors
United States Army Air Forces personnel of World War II
United States Army Air Forces officers
United States Air Force officers
United States Air Force personnel of the Korean War
Military personnel from Illinois
Federal Theatre Project people